Verona Marjanović (born 1 February 1974) is a Bosnian luger. She competed in the women's singles event at the 1994 Winter Olympics.

References

External links
 

1974 births
Living people
Bosnia and Herzegovina female lugers
Olympic lugers of Bosnia and Herzegovina
Lugers at the 1994 Winter Olympics
Sportspeople from Sarajevo